The IPSC Nordic Handgun Championship is an IPSC level 3 championship hosted in every year either in Norway, Sweden, Finland or Denmark. Until 2017 the championships were held annually in all divisions. But from 2018 onward championships in Open and Production division will be held even years and championships in Classic, Revolver and Standard divisions uneven years.

Champions 
The following is a list of current and past IPSC Nordic Handgun champions.

Overall category

|-

Lady category

Junior category

Senior category

Super Senior category

Team category

Team Lady category

See also 
 IPSC Nordic Mini Rifle Championship
 IPSC Nordic Rifle Championship
 IPSC Nordic Shotgun Championship

References 

DSSN Hall of Fame
Match Results - 1996 Nordic Handgun Championship, Denmark
Match Results - 1997 Nordic Handgun Championship, Open, Finland

Match Results - 1998 Nordic Handgun Championship, Standard, Sweden
Match Results - 2003 Nordic Handgun Championship, Finland
Match Results - 2004 Nordic Handgun Championship, Standard and Revolver, Denmark
Match Results - 2004 Nordic Handgun Championship, Open, Modified and Production, Denmark
Match Results - 2005 Nordic Handgun Championship, Standard, Norway
Match Results - 2006 Nordic Handgun Championship, Standard, Denmark
Match Results - 2006 Nordic Handgun Championship, Revolver, Denmark
Match Results - 2006 Nordic Handgun Championship, Modified and Open, Sweden
Match Results - 2007 Nordic Handgun Championship, Open, Norway
Match Results - 2007 Nordic Handgun Championship, Production, Norway
Match Results - 2007 Nordic Handgun Championship, Standard, Finland
Match Results - 2008 Nordic Handgun Championship, Open and Production Denmark
Match Results - 2008 Nordic Handgun Championship, Standard and Revolver, Sweden
Match Results - 2009 Nordic Handgun Championship, Open and Production, Finland
Match Results - 2009 Nordic Handgun Championship, Standard, Norway
Match Results - 2010 Nordic Handgun Championship, Open and Production, Sweden
Match Results - 2010 Nordic Handgun Championship, Revolver and Standard, Denmark
Match Results - 2011 Nordic Handgun Championship, Open, Norway
Match Results - 2011 Nordic Handgun Championship, Production, Norway
Match Results - 2011 Nordic Handgun Championship, Standard, Finland
Match Results - 2012 Nordic Handgun Championship, Open and Production, Denmark
Match Results - 2012 Nordic Handgun Championship, Revolver and Standard, Sweden
Match Results - 2013 Nordic Handgun Championship, Revolver and Classic, Norway
Match Results - 2013 Nordic Handgun Championship, Production, Finland
Match Results - 2013 Nordic Handgun Championship, Standard, Norway
Match Results - 2014 Nordic Handgun Championship, Classic, Revolver and Standard, Denmark
Match Results - 2014 Nordic Handgun Championship, Open and Production, Sweden
Match Results - 2015 Nordic Handgun Championship, Classic, Revolver and Standard, Finland
Match Results - 2015 Nordic Handgun Championship, Open, Norway
Match Results - 2015 Nordic Handgun Championship, Production, Norway
Match Results - 2016 Nordic Handgun Championship, Classic and Revolver, Sweden
Match Results - 2016 Nordic Handgun Championship, Open and Production, Denmark
Match Results - 2016 Nordic Handgun Championship, Standard, Sweden

IPSC shooting competitions
Shooting sports in Europe by country
Sport in Scandinavia
Inter-Nordic sports competitions